Paranaesthetis metallica is a species of beetle in the family Cerambycidae, and the only species in the genus Paranaesthetis. It was described by Breuning in 1982.

References

Desmiphorini
Beetles described in 1982
Monotypic beetle genera